John Hollings or Hollins, FRS M.D. (1683?–1739) was an English physician.

Hollings was born about 1683, the son of John Hollings, M.D., of Shrewsbury, and formerly fellow of Magdalene College, Cambridge. After attending Shrewsbury School, he entered Emmanuel College, Cambridge in 1700, shortly afterwards migrating to Magdalene College as a pensioner on 27 March 1700. He proceeded M.B. in 1705 and M.D. in 1710. He was admitted a candidate of the Royal College of Physicians on 25 June 1725, and a fellow on 25 June 1726, having on 16 March previously been elected a Fellow of the Royal Society. He rose to be physician-general to the army and physician in ordinary to the king from 1727 to 1739.

He died in Pall Mall on 10 May 1739. By his wife Jane he had a son, John Hollings, M.D., who died on 28 December 1739, and two daughters, Mrs. (Jane) Champernowne and Margaret. Hollings's reputation for classical scholarship and general culture was considerable. His only publication was the Harveian oration for 1734, entitled Status Humanæ Naturæ expositus in Oratione coram Medicis Londinensibus habita, 4to, London, 1734, of which an English translation appeared the same year.

References

1680s births
1739 deaths
17th-century English writers
17th-century English male writers
18th-century English medical doctors
Medical doctors from Shrewsbury
Alumni of Trinity College, Cambridge
Fellows of the Royal Society
18th-century English writers
18th-century English male writers
Physicians-in-Ordinary
English male writers